The 2013 Jacksonville State Gamecocks football team represented Jacksonville State University as a member of the Ohio Valley Conference (OVC) during the 2013 NCAA Division I FCS football season. Led by Bill Clark his first and only season as head coach, the Gamecocks compiled an overall record of 11–4 with a mark of 5–3 in conference play, tying for third place in the OVC. Jacksonville State received an at-large bid to NCAA Division I Football Championship playoffs, defeating Samford in the first round and McNeese State in the second round before losing to Eastern Washington in the quarterfinals. The team played home games at Burgess–Snow Field at JSU Stadium in Jacksonville, Alabama.

On January 21, 2014, Clark resigned to become the head football coach at the University of Alabama at Birmingham (UAB).

Schedule

Game summaries

@ Alabama State

Jacksonville

North Alabama

@ Georgia State

Murray State

@ UT Martin

Tennessee State

@ Tennessee Tech

@ Austin Peay

Eastern Kentucky

@ Eastern Illinois

Southeast Missouri State

Samford

McNeese State

Ranking movements

References

Jacksonville State
Jacksonville State Gamecocks football seasons
Jacksonville State
Jacksonville State Gamecocks football